Lotem (lit. Cistus) is a village in northern Israel divided into a part run as a kibbutz and a part run as a community settlement. Located in the Galilee, it falls under the jurisdiction of Misgav Regional Council.

History
The village was founded in 1978 as a kibbutz. In 1992 it became the first kibbutz to initiate a community expansion and today the village includes both the kibbutz and a community settlement.

References

External links
Official website

Kibbutzim
Kibbutz Movement
Populated places established in 1978
Populated places in Northern District (Israel)
1978 establishments in Israel